Ribes marshallii is a North American species of currant known by the common names Hupa gooseberry and Marshall's gooseberry. It is endemic to the Klamath Mountains of southern Oregon and northern California.

Ribes marshallii grows in mountain coniferous forests. It is a shrub producing arching stems 1 to 2 meters (40-80 inches) long which may root at the tip when it reaches moist substrate. Nodes on the stem bear three spines each up to a centimeter (0.4 inch) long. The lightly hairy leaves are roughly three centimeters (1.2 inches) long and are divided into a few widely toothed lobes. Glandular hairs occur on veins and leaf margins. The inflorescence is a solitary flower or raceme of up to three flowers which hang pendent from the branches from leaf axils. The small, showy flower has five pointed purple-red sepals which are reflexed upward. At the center is a tubular corolla of bright yellow petals from which emerge five stamens and two thin, mostly fused styles. The fruit is a prickly oblong berry up to 2 centimeters (0.8 inch) long which ripens to dark red. The fruits are edible and reputedly palatable.

References

External links
Jepson Manual Treatment
Calphotos Photo gallery, University of California

marshallii
Flora of California
Flora of Oregon
Plants described in 1887
Flora without expected TNC conservation status